The 1879 Yale Bulldogs football team represented Yale University in the 1879 college football season. The team finished with a 3–0–2 record and was retroactively named co-national champion by Parke H. Davis.

Schedule

Roster
 Forwards: Franklin M. Eaton, John S. Harding, Louis K. Hull, Benjamin B. Lamb, Howard H. Knapp, John Moorhead Jr., Frederic Remington, Charles S. Beck
 Halfbacks: Walter Irving Badger, Walter Camp, George H. Clark, William A. Peters, Robert W. Watson
 Backs: William K. Nixon, Chester W. Lyman
 Others: Benjamin Wisner Bacon, John S. Durand, John F. Merrill, Charles B. Storrs, Frederick R. Vernon
 Manager: Eugene W. Walker

References

Yale
Yale Bulldogs football seasons
College football national champions
College football undefeated seasons
Yale Bulldogs football